Vernon Hopper was an American football coach.  He was the third head football coach at Adams State College—now known as Adams State University—in Alamosa, Colorado and he held that position for four seasons, from 1939 until 1942.  His coaching record at Adams State was 5–17–2.

References

Year of birth missing
Year of death missing
Adams State Grizzlies football coaches